Pseudaegina is a genus of cnidarians belonging to the monotypic family Pseudaeginidae.

The species of this genus are found in Caribbean.

Species:

Pseudaegina pentanema 
Pseudaegina rhodina

References

Narcomedusae
Hydrozoan genera